Sant Joan (Catalan for St John) is a village and municipality on Majorca in Spain.

Sant Joan may also refer to:

Places in Spain
Sant Joan de les Abadesses, Ripollès, Catalonia
Sant Joan Despí, Baix Llobregat, Catalonia
Sant Joan d'Alacant, Alicante, Valencia
Sant Joan de Labritja, Ibiza
Sant Joan de l'Ènova, Ribera Alta, Valencia
Sant Joan de l'Erm, a ski resort in Alt Urgell, Catalonia
Sant Joan de Mollet, Gironès, Catalonia
Sant Joan de Vilatorrada, Bages, Catalonia
Sant Joan les Fonts, Garrotxa, Catalonia

Churches
Sant Joan de Boí, in Boí, Catalonia
Sant Joan de Caselles, Andorra
Sant Joan de Foixà, in Foixà, Catalonia
Sant Joan de Sispony, Andorra

Other places
Son Sant Joan Airport, Palma de Mallorca
Funicular de Sant Joan, a railway in Montserrat, Catalonia
Passeig de Sant Joan, Barcelona, a major street

Festivals
Sant Joan or Bonfires of Saint John, a festival that takes place on the evening of 23 June

See also
Saint-Jean (disambiguation)
Saint Joan (disambiguation)
Saint John (disambiguation)
Saint Juan (disambiguation)
San Juan (disambiguation)
São João (disambiguation)